Kampen mod uretten is a 1949 Danish drama film directed by Ole Palsbo, and written by Leck Fischer, based on the novel by Sven Sabroe. The film starred Karin Nellemose and Mogens Wieth. Both received Bodil Awards for their roles, with Nellemose receiving Bodil Award for Best Actress and Wieth winning Bodil Award for Best Actor. It is a social culture film about Peter Sabroe's fight for the well being of children.

Cast
Mogens Wieth as Peter Sabroe
Karin Nellemose as Thyra Sabroe 
Albert Luther as Kancelliråd Møller
Ellen Margrethe Stein as Fru Møller
Vera Gebuhr as Fanny
Paul Holck-Hofmann as Redaktør
Carl Heger as Murersvend Nielsen
Grethe Thordahl as Mathilde Nielsen 
Pouel Kern as Lars Mortensen
Betty Helsengreen as Petra Mortensen 
Sigurd Langberg as Forpagter 
Ib Schønberg as Drengehjemsforstander 
Preben Lerdorff Rye as Opsynsmand Hansen 
Louis Miehe-Renard as Niels 
Aage Fønss as Bestyrelsesformand
Lily Broberg as Hushjælpen Anna 
Gunnar Lemvigh as Bagermester Eriksen 
Tove Bang as Fru Eriksen
Hans Egede Budtz as Læge 
Christen Møller 
Kjeld Petersen      
Victor Montell     
Edith Hermansen  
Olaf Ussing        
Johannes Marott 
Henry Nielsen  
Elith Foss     
Gunnar Strømvad   
Thorkil Lauritzen    
Bjørn Watt-Boolsen  
Valdemar Skjerning    
Tavs Neiiendam     
Ove Sprogøe

External links

1940s Danish-language films
1949 films
Danish drama films
1949 drama films
Danish black-and-white films